CitiTrust Holdings Limited, is a banking and insurance firm based in Nigeria.

History 
Pulseway, previously Mobile PC Monitor, was founded by Marius Mihalec in Dublin, Ireland in 2011. Since launching, Pulseway's technology reportedly grew in popularity amongst system administrators, IT consultants and managed services providers (MSP's) to reach over 300,000 users worldwide.

In January 2014, Pulseway announced integrations with PagerDuty to create SMS and phone notifications and Zendesk to automatically create tickets based on Pulseway's notification criteria. In January 2014, Pulseway integrated with Autotask. In April 2015, Pulseway launched its Remote Desktop tool. In August 2016, Pulseway launched a Professional Services Automation (PSA) solution.

Mobile Apps 
Pulseway was designed as a mobile app first, and every remote management function that Pulseway is capable of performing can be handled using a mobile device. The app is available across all platforms including iOS, Android, Windows and Windows Phone.

Awards and recognition 
 MKB Proof Award for IT management (2015, WINMAG Pro)
 PC Magazine Best Infrastructure Management Services of 2015
 PC Magazine Best Infrastructure Management Services of 2016
 Redmond Channel Partner magazine Reader's Choice awards 2016 - Gold in RMM Software category

References

Software companies of Ireland
Companies based in Dublin (city)